Christopher Joseph Paddack (born January 8, 1996) is an American professional baseball pitcher for the Minnesota Twins of Major League Baseball (MLB). He made his debut in 2019 with the San Diego Padres. During his 2019 season, he earned the nickname "Paddack Attack" for his first-pitch strike-heavy approach and relentless assault on opposing hitters with his fastball and changeup combination. Paddack also occasionally goes by the nickname "Sheriff."

Career

Amateur career
Paddack attended Cedar Park High School in Cedar Park, Texas. He committed to play college baseball for the Texas A&M Aggies.

Miami Marlins
He was drafted by the Miami Marlins in the eighth round of the 2015 Major League Baseball draft and signed. He made his professional debut that year with the Gulf Coast Marlins where he went 4–3 with a 2.18 ERA in 11 games (seven starts). He started 2016 with the Greensboro Grasshoppers.

San Diego Padres
On June 30, 2016, the Marlins traded Paddack to the San Diego Padres for Fernando Rodney. He was then assigned to the Fort Wayne TinCaps. On July 30, 2016, Paddack was diagnosed with a torn UCL. He underwent Tommy John surgery on August 15 and missed the rest of the 2016 season. In nine starts between Greensboro and Fort Wayne, he posted a 2–0 record and 0.85 ERA along with 71 strikeouts. The surgery forced Paddack to also miss all of 2017.

Paddack returned to the mound in 2018 with the High-A Lake Elsinore Storm. With the Storm, he pitched to a 2.24 ERA in 52 innings before being promoted to the AA San Antonio Missions. He was even better for the Missions, pitching to a 1.91 ERA in 38 innings before reaching his innings limit and being shut down for the remainder of the season. The Padres added him to their 40-man roster after the season.

Paddack was invited to spring training by the Padres in 2019 and dominated, pitching to a 3-1 record and a 1.76 ERA in 5 games, earning him a spot on the team's opening day rotation. On March 31, 2019, he made his major league debut with a start versus the San Francisco Giants. He allowed one run over five innings and recorded seven strikeouts. On June 12, 2019, he was optioned to Lake Elsinore as a way to lessen his amount of innings pitched. He was recalled on June 22. In 2019, Paddack finished with a record of 9-7 and a 3.33 ERA in 26 starts. He struck out 153 in  innings. Paddack was named the Opening day starter for the Padres in 2020. He finished 4–5 with a 4.73 ERA. Throughout the season, Paddack struggled with command as he allowed 14 home runs in just 59 innings.

Minnesota Twins
On April 7, 2022, the Padres traded Paddack, Emilio Pagán, and a player to be named later to the Minnesota Twins in exchange for Taylor Rogers, Brent Rooker, and cash considerations. On May 10, 2022, Paddack was put on the 10-day injured list due to a right elbow strain. He underwent his second Tommy John surgery on May 18, ending his season.

On January 13, 2023, Paddack agreed to a one-year, $2.4 million contract with the Twins, avoiding salary arbitration. Later that day, Paddack agreed to a three-year, $12.5 million contract extension with the Twins that bought out his two remaining arbitration-eligible years and what would have been his first year of free agency.

References

External links

1996 births
Living people
Baseball players from Austin, Texas
Major League Baseball pitchers
San Diego Padres players
Minnesota Twins players
Gulf Coast Marlins players
Greensboro Grasshoppers players
Fort Wayne TinCaps players
Lake Elsinore Storm players
San Antonio Missions players